Georgy Frantsevich Millyar, sometimes spelled Milliar (7 November 1903 in Moscow – 4 June 1993 in Moscow), was a Soviet and Russian actor, best known for playing evil spirits in Soviet fairy tale films, including the witch Baba Yaga in films such as Vasilisa the Beautiful, Jack Frost, Fire, Water, and Brass Pipes and The Golden Horns.

Biography
Georgy Millyar was born into a wealthy family of Franz de Milieu, a French bridge builder working in Russia, and Elizaveta Zhuravlyova, a daughter of an Irkutsk goldminer. Millyar's father died when he was almost three. Before the outbreak of World War I, he and his widowed mother had moved from Moscow to Gelendzhik. After the October Revolution, Millyar's family was left without relatives and means of living, their apartment in Moscow and a house in Gelendzhik were soon nationalized by the Bolsheviks. Millyar's mother was prudent enough to remove the "de" particle from her and her son's last name to conceal their French origin and then change it to Millyar. Even though Georgy Millyar was able to speak fluent French and German, he never mentioned this fact in any official documents.

After the October Revolution, Georgy Millyar worked as a props man at a Gelendzhik theater. He always dreamed of becoming a professional actor and memorized all the roles played at his theater. In 1920, Millyar made his first incidental appearance on stage when one of the actors fell suddenly ill. His debut was a success, and from then on he was asked to substitute on a regular basis. In 1924, Georgy Millyar, already a well-known provincial actor, entered an Acting School for Juniors at Moscow Theater of the Revolution (today's Mayakovsky Theater). Subsequently, he played different roles in numerous stage plays.

Prominent Soviet film director Aleksandr Rou played an important part in Georgy Millyar's acting career. He invited Millyar to star in a film adaptation of a Russian fairy tale, Wish upon a Pike (1938). From that moment on, their cinematographic partnership and friendship lasted for over 30 years. Millyar acted in all Rou's films. Among his roles are Kashei the Deathless, Baba-Yaga, king Goroh, king Chudo-Yudo, a demon etc. Throughout his career, Georgy Millyar played thirty major roles, took part in the dubbing of seventy movies, and voiced over a hundred cartoons. He died in 1993, 2 years after the Dissolution of the Soviet Union.

Selected filmography

References

External links

 Georgy Millyar

1903 births
1993 deaths
20th-century Russian male actors
Male actors from Moscow
Honored Artists of the RSFSR
People's Artists of the RSFSR

Russian male actors
Russian male film actors
Russian male stage actors
Russian male voice actors
Russian people of French descent
Soviet male actors
Soviet male film actors
Soviet male stage actors
Soviet male voice actors
Burials in Troyekurovskoye Cemetery